Valentyna Oleksandrivna Semerenko, known also as Valya Semerenko and featuring in statistics as Valj Semerenko (born 18 January 1986) is a Ukrainian biathlete. She is Olympic and World champion, multiple World championships medalist, and one of the most successful Ukrainian winter athletes.

Career
When she was in the fourth grade of elementary school, she took up cross-country skiing together with her twin sister Vita. But later, they decided to switch to biathlon. She began competing internationally a year earlier than Vita. In 2004 she took part at Junior World Championships in Maurienne, France. In 2005 she won two medals at Junior World and one at Junior European Championships. On 17 December 2005, she debuted in Biathlon World Cup. She finished her first World Cup sprint competition in Osrblie, Slovakia, ranking 47th. Valja managed to qualify for 2006 Winter Olympics, where she took part only in individual race, finishing 46th.

For the first time, she participated at the World Championships in 2007 in Antholz-Anterselva, Italy. Valja missed almost half of the 2006-07 Biathlon World Cup. The next season was more successful. She won the silver medal in the 4×6 km relay event at the Biathlon World Championships 2008. First World Cup relay victory came on 7 January 2009, in Oberhof, Germany.

She represented Ukraine at the 2010 Winter Olympics in Vancouver, British Columbia, Canada. In all races she placed between 13 and 23.

First individual podium Valja celebrated on 4 February 2011, in Presque Isle, United States, in sprint. At the 2013 World Championships, Valja won bronze in individual race and silver in relay. On 15 December 2013, Valja won a pursuit race in Annecy, France, which was her first individual World Cup victory.

Together with Juliya Dzhyma, Vita Semerenko and Olena Pidhrushna she won the gold medal in the Women's relay at the 2014 Winter Olympics, in Sochi, Russia.

2014–15 season was the most successful as of January 2018. That season she had four individual podiums and finished third in World Cup classification, being the second-ever Ukrainian biathlete to finish a season in Top-3 after Olena Zubrilova. After Christmas, Valja together with Serhiy Semenov, she won World Team Challenge. The most memorable achievement was victory in mass start at 2015 World Championships in Kontiolahti, Finland. The next two seasons weren't very successful due to illnesses and weak physical conditions. Valja was forced to miss a lot of races.

She qualified to represent Ukraine at the 2018 Winter Olympics. Her best personal result at the Games was 19th place in the mass start. She expected to run in the women's relay but wasn't included in the roster. Later she accused coaches of ignoring her results and including not so successful at the Games Iryna Varvynets and Anastasiya Merkushyna in the relay team. Her sister Vita Semerenko later told in an interview that Valja cried for hours after discovering that she wouldn't participate in the relay. In the evening before the competition, Valja posted on Facebook that "we don't have any team", "our team is just ***" and so on, and that she has something more to unveil about the team. Next day she said that she may finish her sport career immediately after the Games. Nevertheless she competed in World Cup after the Games.

Personal life
Biathlete Vita is her twin sister. Valja is married to Oleksiy Prokhor. She graduated from Sumy State Pedagogical Makarenko University.

Results

Winter Olympics

World Championships

World Cup

Individual podiums

Relay podiums

Positions
 Position (and scores) are shown in the table.

References

External links

Biathlon.com.ua

1986 births
Living people
Ukrainian female biathletes
Olympic biathletes of Ukraine
Biathletes at the 2006 Winter Olympics
Biathletes at the 2010 Winter Olympics
Biathletes at the 2014 Winter Olympics
Biathletes at the 2018 Winter Olympics
Biathletes at the 2022 Winter Olympics
Ukrainian twins
Twin sportspeople
Biathlon World Championships medalists
Medalists at the 2014 Winter Olympics
Olympic gold medalists for Ukraine
Olympic medalists in biathlon
Dynamo sports society athletes
Universiade medalists in biathlon
Universiade silver medalists for Ukraine
Competitors at the 2007 Winter Universiade
Laureates of the Prize of the Cabinet of Ministers of Ukraine for special achievements of youth in the development of Ukraine
Sportspeople from Sumy Oblast